Ants Kaljurand (20 October 1917 – 13 March 1951) popularly known as Ants the Terrible,, was an Estonian Nazi collaborator, anti-communist, and forest brother during and after World War II.

Early life
Ants Kaljurand was born on 20 October 1917 in Tallinn. His mother Juula was born in 1887. There is no information about his father. Kaljurand grew up in the village of Teesu near Pidula Bay on the island of Saaremaa. He graduated from Pidula Primary School. 

In 1935, he went to Koonga Parish (now Lääneranna Parish) in Pärnu County to work as a farm laborer on Sepa Farm. In 1938, he served in the Estonian Defense Forces and then continued on as a laborer on Sepa Farm.

Partisan life 
Kaljurand joined the Forest Brothers and in the summer of 1941, attacked Soviet forces in Lääne and Pärnu Counties. During the occupation of Estonia by Nazi Germany, he served in the collaborationist paramilitary Omakaitse and was served on the front from 1942 to 1944. After the retreat of the Germans in 1944, he remained a prisoner of war on Saaremaa, but escaped from the prison camp in December of the same year and continued his activities in the Forest Brothers. 

During Estonia's Soviet era, Kaljurand served as the local leader of the Armed Combat Union (Relvastatud Võitluse Liit), founded under the leadership of Endel Redlich, in Soontaga.

Capture and execution 
It was not until midsummer 1949 that the NKVD arrested him. 

On 24 June 1949 Ants Kaljurand and two members of his squad were discovered sleeping in the woods near the village of Võitra. Forest Brother Aleksander Valter and Arved Pill were seriously wounded in an exchange of fire. Ants tried to escape, but was wounded with a bayonet and captured.

Kaljurand, Pill and Juhan Metsaäär were sentenced to death, others to from ten to twenty-five years in a prison camp. They were executed on 13 March 1951.

Memorial 
On 10 July 2011 a memorial stone of Ants Kaljurand was unveiled at the Mihkli Church in Koonga Parish, Pärnu County, on the initiative of the Estonian Defense League.

See also
 Estonian partisans
 Summer War

References

Further reading

Valdek Kiiver: Hirmus-Ants. Bandiit, kangelane, legend. Kirjastus Aja lood, Tartu, 2010;  (in Estonian)
Mati Mandel: Kogu tõde Hirmus Antsust?. Eesti Ajaloomuuseum, Tallinn, 2010;  (in Estonian)

External links

  Varsti tulevad Truman ja Hirmus Ants! – Maaleht (in Estonian)
 Raivo Raudkivi, Lapsepõlve lood: öine külaline ehk Hirmsa Antsuga söögilauas (in Estonian)

1917 births
1951 deaths
Estonian anti-communists
Estonian independence activists
Estonian military personnel
Estonian people of World War II
Estonian collaborators with Nazi Germany
Estonian people executed by the Soviet Union
Executed Soviet collaborators with Nazi Germany
Nazis executed by the Soviet Union by firearm
People from Saaremaa Parish

People executed by the Soviet Union by firearm